Foil may refer to:

Materials
 Foil (metal), a quite thin sheet of metal, usually manufactured with a rolling mill machine
 Metal leaf, a very thin sheet of decorative metal
 Aluminium foil, a type of wrapping for food
 Tin foil, metal foil made of tin, the direct predecessor to  aluminium foil
 Transparency (projection), a thin sheet of transparent flexible material, placed on an overhead projector for display to an audience

Fluid dynamics
 Foil (fluid mechanics)
 Airfoil, a foil operating in air
 Hydrofoil, a foil operating in water
 Parafoil, a non-rigid airfoil, inflated during use
 Foil bearing, a type of fluid bearing

Arts and culture
 Foil (architecture), decorative device derived from cusps of circles
 Foil stamping, a printmaking technique
 Foil (fencing), one of the three weapons used in modern fencing
 Foil (fiction), a subsidiary character who emphasizes the traits of a main character
 Comedic or comic foil, the straight man in a comedy double act
 "Foil" (song), "Weird Al" Yankovic's parody of Lorde's song "Royals"

Navigation
 Hydrofoil, a type of high-powered motorboat that uses underwater foils to lift its hull above the water when moving at high speeds
 Bruce foil, a foil used on an outrigger to prevent a boat from heeling
 Centreboard, a movable keel that functions as a foil
 Foilboard, a surfboard using a hydrofoil

Other uses
 People in a police lineup
 First-order inductive learner – a rule-based learning algorithm
 The FOIL method, a mnemonic in algebra, to expand the product of two first-degree polynomials ("linear factors")
 FOIL (programming language), either of two now-defunct computer programming languages
 Forum of Indian Leftists, a political group of Indian intellectuals
 Freedom of information legislation or Freedom of Information Law (FOIL)
 Ultrasonic foil (papermaking), a type of high-frequency vibrating foil involved in papermaking
 Split tally, in ancient financial accounting, the part of a split tally stick given to the recipient in a transaction